Nasrollah Mahalleh (also Romanized as Naşrollāh Maḩalleh; also known as Naşrollāh Khān Maḩalleh) is a village in Gasht Rural District, in the Central District of Fuman County, Gilan Province, Iran. At the 2006 census, its population was 483, in 118 families.

References 

Populated places in Fuman County